Thalassocola ureilytica is a Gram-negative, aerobic and rod-shaped bacterium from the genus of Thalassocola which has been isolated from seawater from the South China Sea.

References

Rhodospirillales
Bacteria described in 2015